Bintan Lagoon Resort is a hotel and resort on the north coast of Bintan, Indonesia. It is located 75 minutes by direct high-speed ferry from Singapore. The resort and ferry, is set in over 300 hectares of gardens overlooks the South China Sea and the archipelago of the Riau Islands.

This Bintan resort is also a sister hotel to Baan Yin Dee Boutique Resort in Phuket, Thailand.

The resort has recently launched its new direct ferry service in 2011 and opened a conference centre in its premises  in 2012.

Bintan Lagoon Resort is LEED certified since 2011 and is the first resort in South-East Asia to be awarded the certification.

References

Hotels in Bintan Island
Resorts in Indonesia